The 1933–34 Egypt Cup was the 14th edition of the Egypt Cup.

The final was held on 10 May 1935. The match was contested by Zamalek and Al Ahly, with Zamalek winning 3–0.

Quarter-finals 

|}

Semi-finals 

|}

Final

References 

 

3
Egypt Cup
1934–35 in Egyptian football